Stigmella sruogai is a moth of the family Nepticulidae. It was described by Puplesis and Diškus in 2003. It is known from Nepal.

References

Nepticulidae
Moths of Asia
Moths described in 2003